Richard William Giese (30 April 1924 – 23 February 2010) was a New Zealand flautist and principal flautist with the New Zealand Symphony Orchestra from 1962 to 1986.

Gieses ancestors originated from Thuringia, Germany. His parents were Carl Albin Giese and Jeannie Quinn Giese, née Yeareance, from Newark, New Jersey. He had two younger sisters, Alice Miriam and Gertrude Jean, and an older brother, Carl Albin.

He taught many flautists, including Ingrid Culliford and Marya Martin.  He was previously married to Myra Giese.

Giese, who had remained mentally sharp and fiercely independent, was found dead on 8 March 2010, having died of a heart attack around two weeks earlier. The coroner criticised the retirement home Giese lived in and said that it was "unacceptable that a person may lie deceased in their home for some weeks".

References

 A sound of flutes New Zealand Listener, 6 June 1969: p. 57.
 Richard Giese New Zealand Listener, 17 January 1969

New Zealand flautists
People from Wellington City
1924 births
2010 deaths
New Zealand Symphony Orchestra people